The list of Furman University people includes alumni, attendees, faculty, and staff of Furman University.

Presidents

1. James Clement Furman was elected the first president of Furman University in 1859. He served for twenty years, until 1879. 
2. Charles Manly served as president from 1859 to 1879. He was a Baptist minister. Manly Hall (built in 1956) is named after him. He is credited for allowing the campus to become more residential, in contrast to previous administrators who did not favor dormitories. 
3. Andrew Philip Montague was president for five years, from 1897 to 1902. While his two predecessors were involved in Christian life prior to being presidents, Montague was dean at Columbia University.
4. Charles Hallette Judson was Acting President over a year, from 1902 to 1903. Prior to this, he was president of the Greenville Woman's College.
5. Edwin McNeill Poteat strengthened the university in many ways during his fifteen years presidency, from 1903 to 1918. He encouraged the recruiting of faculty with advanced degrees, including the first PhD to be hired at Furman, Sidney Ernest Bradshaw. 
6. After the previous president resigned to pursue mission work in China, Sidney Ernest Bradshaw became interim president for one year (1918–1919) while the board of trustees prepared to hire the next president.
7. William Joseph McGlothlin, a professor of church history, came from the Southern Baptist Theological Seminar in 1919 to serve as President at Furman, where he remained in this post until 1933. (1919–1933)
8. Bennette Eugene Geer, also known as 'Ben Geer', became president in 1933. His friendship with James Buchanan Duke was instrumental to name Furman as a beneficiary of the Duke Endowment. In the terms of the endowment, Furman was referred to as "that little college located in Greenville that Ben Geer is such a fool about". Geer was a graduate of Furman, and as such, the first Furman graduate to assume the presidency. Financial support progressed under Geer's presidency, echoing his own times when he was able to afford education at Furman in part thanks to living in the house of then president Manly. His presidency ended in 1938.
9. Robert Norman Daniel was Acting President during the remainder of the year 1938.
10. John Laney Plyler oversaw a transformation of Furman during a long lasting presidency of 25 years, from 1939 to 1964. He received a Bachelor of Arts degree from Furman University, and was trained at the Harvard Law School. Under his presidency, land was bought for the new campus and Furman moved from downtown Greenville to its current location.
11. Gordon Williams Blackwell, was the president of Florida State University, who then came as the new President of Furman in 1965. His interest in excellence by national standards contributed to start the transformation of Furman as a higher education institute of national stature, as it is still categorized today (among national liberal arts universities). His term ended after ten years, in 1976.
12. John Edwin Johns, was president of Furman from 1976 to 1994. He had a distinguished military career with several military honors (e.g., Flying Cross, Air Medal) and flew 35 combat missions in Europe during World War II aboard a B-17 aircraft. A graduate of Furman, he received a PhD in history from the University of North Carolina. After a long academic career at Stetson University culminating in its presidency, he joined Furman as president and grew the university's endowment tenfold through capital campaigns.
13. David Emory Shi, a historian, author and champion of sustainability, served as the university's president from 1994 to 2010. He highlighted some of his accomplishments as "faculty salaries improved dramatically, the endowment quadrupled, the academic profile of the student body rose, and the campus benefited from more than $210 million in new construction and renovation". 
14. Rodney A. Smolla, a nationally known lawyer, held the presidency for three years, from 2010 to 2013. After personal reasons, he stepped down from the post and described Furman as "one of the gems of American higher education", for which he is remembered for a continued growth of application for admissions and the endowment.
15. Carl F. Kohrt was Interim President for a year, from 2013 to 2014.
16. Elizabeth Davis became Furman's President on July 1, 2014. Davis came to Furman from Baylor University in Texas, where she was Executive Vice President and Provost. The Furman Advantage was launched under her presidency.

Notable alumni

Science
 Brad Cox (Class of 1967) - Computer scientist, creator of the Objective-C programming language
 Howard Davis (Class of 1959) - Chemical engineer
 Wilton R. Earle (Class of 1923) - Cell biologist
 Hans Einstein (Class of 1942) - Foremost authority on the lung disease Valley Fever
 Thomas T. Goldsmith (Class of 1931) - Physicist who helped pioneer the invention of Color Television, and Inventor of the first video game.
 Sandra Greer- American physical chemist in the field of thermodynamics
Paige Harden (Class of 2003) - Psychologist and behavior geneticist, Award for Distinguished Scientific Early Career Contributions to Psychology from the American Psychological Association
 Valerie Horsley (Class of 1998) - Biologist
 Frances Ligler (Class of 1973) - Biochemist and bioengineer, 2017 inductee of the National Inventors Hall of Fame
 Julie McElrath (Class of 1973) - Leading HIV immunology and vaccine researchers
 Earle K. Plyler (Class of 1917) - Physicist and pioneer in the field of Molecular Spectroscopy
 Albert Ernest Radford (Class of 1939) - Botanist, mainly known for the Manual of the Vascular Flora of the Carolinas, the definitive flora for North Carolina and South Carolina.
 Charles Townes (Class of 1935) - 1964 Nobel Prize in Physics winner, inventor of the maser, laid theoretical groundwork for invention of laser
 John B. Watson (Class of 1899) - American Psychologist, founder of Behaviorism
 John H. Wotiz (Class of 1941) - Organic chemist

Arts and theatre 
 Elizabeth Bishop (Class of 1989) - Mezzo-soprano with the Metropolitan Opera New York, New York
 John Bloomfield (Class of 1975) - Pianist
 Robert Blocker (Class of 1968) - Dean of the Yale School of Music and classical pianist
 Jay Bocook (Class of 1975) - Composer and Arranger - Work Featured at 1984 Olympic Games
 Ben Browder (Class of 1985) - Three-time Saturn Awards winner for Best Actor on Television on Farscape
 Jim David (Class of 1976) - Comedian on Comedy Central Presents, actor, writer
 Seth Gilliard (Class of 2012) - Violinist
 Amy Grant - 6-time Grammy Award singer and Christian musician
 Victoria Jackson, actress and comedian, former cast member of NBC Saturday Night Live
 Robert Joel (Class of 1965) - Actor in the early openly gay film A Very Natural Thing
 Keith Lockhart (Class of 1981) - Current conductor of the Boston Pops
 Emile Pandolfi (Class of 1968) - Pianist
 Jesse Rice (Class of 2001) - Multi-platinum Nashville songwriter of Florida Georgia Line #1 hit single Cruise 
 Bear Rinehart (Class of 2003) - Lead vocalist of Needtobreathe, a Grammy-nominated and six time GMA Dove Award- winning modern rock band
 Ginny Ruffner - Glass artist
 Sintax the Terrific (Class of 1998) - Christian hip hop artist and founder of Deepspace5
 Debbie Hughes- Artist and illustrator
 Virginia Uldrick (Class of 1951) - Music and drama teacher, founder and first president of the South Carolina Governor's School for the Arts & Humanities
 Frankie Welch - American fashion designer 
 Donald Reid Womack (Class of 1988) - Composer and Professor, University of Hawaii

Academics, writers, journalist, literature, and publishers
 Eleanor Beardsley (Class of 1986) - Journalist, NPR Correspondent from France
Furman Bisher - Sports writer and columnist
 Maurice Bloomfield (Class of 1877) - Austrian-born U.S. philologist and Sanskrit scholar
 Tomiko Brown-Nagin (Class of 1992) - Legal historian and professor at Harvard Law School and Harvard University
 Vernon Burton (Class of 1969) - Renowned Southern Historian and author of Age of Lincoln
 Betsy Byars - children's author, winner of the Newbery Medal, a National Book Award, an Edgar Award and the Regina Medal
 Marshall Frady (Class of 1963) – Emmy Award winning journalist and biographer
 Lois Gladys Leppard (Class of 1946) - Author of the Mandie children novels.
 John Matthews Manly (M.A. Class of 1884) - Philologist and professor of English literature and philology at the University of Chicago
 Raven I. McDavid Jr. (Class of 1931) - Linguist, dialectologist
 Edmunt Outslay (Class of 1974) - Finance author and Deloitte/Michael Licata Endowed Professor of Taxation at Michigan State University
 Bennie Lee Sinclair (Class of 1961) - poet, novelist, and short story writer. Named South Carolina Poet Laureate from 1986-2000 and a Pulitzer Prize nominee
 George Singleton (Class of 1980) – Novelist
 Cecil Staton (Class of 1980) - Politician, member of the Georgia Senate and Chancellor of East Carolina University
 Allie Beth Stuckey (Class of 2014) - Conservative commentator with BlazeTV and Conservative Review and frequent guest on Fox News
 Phyllis Tickle (M.A. Class of 1961) - Author of spirituality and religion works
 Joshua Treviño (Class of 1997) - Political commentator
 Angela L. Walker Franklin (Class of 1981) - President of Des Moines University
 Robert Whitlow (Class of 1976) - Author and film-maker
 Jack Sullivan- Literary scholar, musicologist and author
 George S. Wise- American sociologist who served as the first president of Tel Aviv University

Business
Ravenel B. Curry III (Class of 1963) - Businessman and philanthropist, founder and president of Eagle Capital Management
 David C. Garrett, Jr. (Class of 1942) - Former CEO of Delta Air Lines
 Robert E. Hill Jr. (Class of 1983) - Former CEO of Acosta Sales & Marketing
 Herman Hipp (Class of 1935) - Former CEO and President Liberty Corporation
 John D. Hollingsworth - Businessman, textile machinery inventor, and philanthropist.
 Carl Kohrt (Class of 1965) - Former Interim President of Furman University and Chief Technology Officer of Kodak
 Sanjay Kumar - Former CEO of Computer Associates, sentenced to 12 years in prison for his role in a massive accounting fraud
 Herman Lay - Founder of the Lay's, later creating the largest-selling snack food company in the US, the Frito-Lay corporation
 Kathryn Petralia (Class of 1992) - Founder of Kabbage
 Paula Wallace (Class of 1970) - Founder of Savannah College of Art and Design
 Tyler Droll (Class of 2013) - Co-Founder of Yik Yak
 Brooks Buffington (Class of 2013) - Co-Founder of Yik Yak

Politics and Law
 Robert T. Ashmore (Class of 1927) - United States Representative from South Carolina
 Julius H. Baggett (Class of 1948) - Member of the South Carolina House of Representatives from 1967 to 1968 and 1970 to 1974
 Maurice G. Burnside (Class of 1926) - United States Representative from West Virginia
 Richard Cash (Class of 1982) - Member of the South Carolina Senate
 Judy Clarke (Class of 1974) - Criminal defense attorney who has represented high-profile defendants such as Ted Kaczynski "The Unabomber", Eric Robert Rudolph, Dzhokhar Tsarnaev and Zacarias Moussaoui. She has negotiated plea agreements that spare her clients the death penalty.
 Wes Climer (Class of 2006) - Member of the South Carolina Senate 
 Neal Collins (Class of 2004) - Member of the South Carolina House of Representatives
 Thomas T. Cullen (Class of 2000) - United States District Judge
 Richard Cullen (Class of 1971) - Former Attorney General of Virginia and high-profile lawyer
 Tom Davis (Class of 1982) - South Carolina State Senator and Chief of Staff to Governor Mark Sanford.
 William Dimitrouleas (Class of 1973) - United States District Judge
 Joseph H. Earle (Class of 1867) - Member of the South Carolina House of Representatives from 1878 to 1882, a member of the South Carolina Senate from 1882 to 1886, South Carolina attorney general from 1886 to 1890 and a United States senator from South Carolina in 1897
 Willa L. Fulmer (Class of 1904) - United States Representative from South Carolina
 Michael E. Guest (Class of 1979) - United States Ambassador to Romania
 Wilton E. Hall (Class of 1924) - Newspaper publisher and United States senator from South Carolina from 1944 to 1945
 Clement Haynsworth (Class of 1933) - Former United States judge and an unsuccessful nominee for the United States Supreme Court
 Max Heller - mayor of Greenville, South Carolina, from 1971 to 1979; held honorary Doctor of Laws degree and Bell Tower Award from Furman, the Furman student services program is named the Max and Trude Heller Service Corps.
 Christina Henderson (Class of 2008) - Member of the Council of the District of Columbia
 Baron Hill (Class of 1975) - United States Representative from Indiana
 Frank Holleman (Class of 1976) - United States Deputy Secretary of Education from 1999 to 2001
 Kim Jackson (Class of 2006 - Member of the Georgia Senate
 Deborah Malac (Class of 1977) - United States Ambassador to Uganda
 Libby Mitchell (Class of 1962) - Maine politician
 Roger C. Peace (Class of 1919) - United States Senator from South Carolina
 William H. Perry (Class of 1857) - United States Representative from South Carolina
 William P Price- United States House of Representatives from Georgia
 Richard Riley (Class of 1954) - Governor of South Carolina from 1979 to 1987, later U.S. Secretary of Education under the Clinton administration from 1993 to 2001
 Thomas A. Roe (Class of 1948) - Conservative philanthropist, founder of the South Carolina Policy Council.
 Madeline Rogero (Class of 1979) - First female mayor of Knoxville, Tennessee
 Mark Sanford (Class of 1982) - Former United States Representative and Governor of South Carolina
 John Calhoun Sheppard (Class of 1871) - The 82nd Governor of South Carolina
 Alexander Stubb (Class of 1993) - Prime Minister of Finland and leader of the Coalition Party
 Nick Theodore (Class of 1952) - Lieutenant Governor of South Carolina from 1987 to 1995
 David Tolbert (Class of 1979) - President of the International Center for Transitional Justice
 David Trone (Class of 1977) - United States Representative from Maryland and founder of Total Wine & More
 Johnnie Mac Walters (Class of 1942) - Commissioner of Internal Revenue from 1971 to 1973
 Henry Hitt Watkins (M.A. Class of 1883) - United States District Judge
 Druanne White (Class of 1981) - Trial lawyer in South Carolina
 John J. Wicker Jr. - Member of the Virginia Senate
 Rob Woodall (Class of 1992) - United States Representative from Georgia

Military and Intelligence 

 John Michael McConnell (Class of 1967) - Served as Director of the National Security Agency and Director of National Intelligence
 John F. Mulholland, Jr. (Class of 1978) - Lieutenant General of United States Army
 Robert G. Owens Jr. (Class of 1938) - Major General of the United States Marine Corps and flying ace
 James Pasquarette (Class of 1983) - Lieutenant General of the United States Army
 Kevin R. Wendel (Class of 1979) - United States Army major general
 Joseph G. Webb Jr. (Class of 1967) - Major General United States Army, Deputy Surgeon General United States Army
 Richard Longo (Class of 1980) - Major General of the United States Army and deputy commanding general and chief of staff for U.S. Army Europe
 Kimberly Hampton - Captain in the United States Army and first American female pilot to die in combat.

Religion
 Casey Cole (Class of 2011) - Catholic priest, writer, and blogger.
 James Crenshaw (Class of 1956) - Theologist and professor of the Old Testament at Duke University Divinity School and world leading scholar in Old Testament literature
 F. W. Dobbs-Allsopp (Class of 1984) - Biblical scholar.
 Ligon Duncan (Class of 1983) - President of the Alliance of Confessing Evangelicals.
 Pleasant Daniel Gold - Baptist minister.
 Kirkman Finlay (Class of 1899) - First bishop of the Episcopal Diocese of Upper South Carolina.
 Duke Kimbrough McCall (Class of 1935) - Executive Member of the Southern Baptist Convention and President of the Southern Baptist Theological Seminary.
 Earl Paulk (Class of 1947) - Founder of Chapel Hill Harvester Church.
 Issachar Jacox Roberts (Class of 1828) - Baptist missionary in China.
 Stacy F. Sauls (Class of 1977) - Bishop for the Episcopal Diocese of Lexington from 2000 to 2011.
 Rembert S. Truluck (Class of 1956) - Theologian

Athletes

Basketball
 Kristofer Acox (Class of 2017) - Icelandic basketball player for KR of the Úrvalsdeild karla and a member of the Icelandic national basketball team
 Robby Bostain (Class of 2007) - American-Israeli basketball player.
 Janet Cone (Class of 1978) - Head athletic director for UNC Asheville Bulldogs, formerly head coach for and athletic director for Samford Bulldogs
 Beth Couture (M.A. Class of 1987) - Head coach of the Butler Bulldogs women's basketball team
 Darrell Floyd (Class of 1956) - Two-time NCAA Consensus All-American basketball player
 Jordan Loyd- professional basketball player for the Toronto Raptors and Valencia Basket
 Clyde Mayers (Class of 1975) - Professional basketball player for the Milwaukee Bucks
 Bobby Roberts (Class of 1953) -  Head men's basketball coach for Clemson University from 1962 to 1970
 Frank Selvy (Class of 1954) - Former NBA All-Star; holds current NCAA Division I record for the most points scored (100) in a single basketball game
 Derek Waugh (Class of 1993) - Head men's basketball coach at Stetson University

Football
 Brian Bratton (Class of 2005) - NFL player, rookie free agent for the Atlanta Falcons in 2005, formerly a receiver for Baltimore Ravens assigned to the Cologne Centurions of NFL Europe.
 Luther Broughton (Class of 1997) - Former NFL tight end
 Dakota Dozier (Class of 2014) - NFL offensive guard for the New York Jets, drafted by the Jets in the fourth round of the 2014 NFL Draft.
 Chas Fox (Class of 1986) - Former NFL wide receiver, 4th round draft pick by the Kansas City Chiefs in 1986 NFL Draft
 Jerome Felton (Class of 2008) - Former NFL All-Pro Fullback, 5th round draft pick by the Detroit Lions in 2008 NFL Draft
 Louis Ivory (Class of 2002) - College football running back, won the 2000 Walter Payton Award
 Stanford Jennings (Class of 1984) - Former NFL player for the Cincinnati Bengals, scored a touchdown in Super Bowl XXIII; current New Balance sales executive
 Ingle Martin (Class of 2006) - NFL player, QB for Kansas City Chiefs
 Billy Napier (Class of 2002) - Head coach of the University of Florida football team and former head coach of the Louisiana Ragin' Cajuns.
 Kevin Steele- Defense coordinator of the University of Miami, former head coach of Baylor University's Bears. 
 Robbie Caldwell (Class of 1976) - Former Head Coach at Vanderbilt University and currently coach at Clemson University
 Kavis Reed (Class of 1995) - Former CFL player, head coach of Edmonton Eskimos
 Orlando Ruff (Class of 1999) - NFL player for Cleveland Browns
 Terry Smith (Class of 1982) - Former NFL player for New England Patriots and head coach of the Great Britain national American football team
 David Whitehurst (Class of 1977) - Former quarterback for the Green Bay Packers
 Sam Wyche (Class of 1968) - Former NFL quarterback and head coach; led Cincinnati Bengals to Super Bowl XXIII

Golf
 Beth Daniel (Class of 1978) - LPGA Tour, World Golf Hall of Fame, 32 career victories
 Brad Faxon (Class of 1983) - eight-time winner on the PGA Tour, played on two Ryder Cup teams
 Bruce Fleisher (Class of 1968) - won the U.S. Amateur in 1968, professional golfer on the PGA Tour and the Champions Tour
 Betsy King (Class of 1977) - LPGA Tour, World Golf Hall of Fame, 34 career victories
 Dottie Pepper (Class of 1987) - Former LPGA Tour champion; current NBC and Golf Channel commentator
 Sherri Turner (Class of 1979) - Professional golfer, won the 1988 LPGA Championship
 Maggie Will (Class of 1987)- Professional golfer, 3 LPGA Tour titles

Soccer
 Ricardo Clark - Professional soccer player for Houston Dynamo, 2003 MLS Rookie of the Year runner-up, member of the United States men's national soccer team
 Clint Dempsey - Professional soccer player for American team Seattle Sounders of the MLS, 2004 MLS Rookie of the Year and member of the United States men's national soccer team, only US player to score a goal in the 2006 World Cup, scored first American goal in 2010 World Cup in South Africa in 1-1 match versus England, first American player to record a hat-trick in the Premier League
 Lewis Hawke (Class of 2017) - Professional soccer player for Montrose F.C.
 Alec Kann (Class of 2012) - Professional soccer player for the MLS Atlanta United FC
 Jonathan Leathers (Class of 2008) - Professional soccer player for the MLS Vancouver Whitecaps
 Drew Moor- Professional soccer player for MLS Toronto FC, member of the United States men's national soccer team in 2007-2008
 John Barry Nusum (Class of 2002) - Professional soccer player for the Virginia Beach Mariners and Philadelphia Kixx
 Sergei Raad (Class of 2004) - Professional soccer player for the MLS Kansas City Wizards
 Shea Salinas (Class of 2008) - Professional soccer player for the MLS San Jose Earthquakes
 Pete Santora (Class of 1998) - Professional soccer player for the Albuquerque Geckos and Jacksonville Cyclones
 Walker Zimmerman - Professional soccer player for the MLS FC Dallas, member of the United States men's national soccer team

Baseball 
 Mike Buddie (Class of 1992) - professional baseball pitcher for the New York Yankees, current athletic director of the United States Military Academy
 Jay Jackson (Class of 2008) - professional baseball pitcher, for the Milwaukee Brewers
 Jerry Martin (Class of 1971) - professional baseball outfielder for the New York Mets
 Tom Mastny (Class of 2003) - MLB pitcher, former player for Cleveland Indians.
 Bob Smith (Class of 1934) - head baseball coach for Clemson University from 1952 to 1957
Nate Smith (Class of 2013)- professional baseball pitcher for the Los Angeles Angels
 Rick Wilkins - professional baseball catcher for the Chicago Cubs

Other Sports
 Angel Martino (Class of 1989) - Olympic gold medalist in swimming
 David Segal (Class of 1963) - Olympic bronze medalist in track and field
Paul Anderson - Olympic gold medalist and world champion in weightlifting
Nathan Riech- Paralympic gold medalist at the 2020 Tokyo Paralympic Games
Ryan Boyle- Paralympic silver medalist at the 2016 Rio Paralympic Games
Kathlyn Kelley- Olympic high jumper who placed 9th at the 1936 Olympics in Berlin
Ned Caswell- Professional tennis player 
 Xavier Woods (Class of 2008) - Professional wrestler for World Wrestling Entertainment

References

External links 
 Furman University
 Furman Paladins

Furman University people